Char Madraj is a union territory of Char Fasson Upazila in Bhola district in Bangladesh.

Area
The area of Char Madraj Union is 11,144 acres.

Administrative Structure
Char Madraj Union is a union of Char Fasson Upazila. Administrative activities of this union are under Char Fasson police Station. It is part of Bhola-4 constituency 118 of the National Assembly.

Population Data
According to the 2011 census, the total population of Char Madraj Union is 33,229. Of these, 16,653 are males and 16,553 are females. The total number of families is 7,045.

Education
According to the 2011 census, Char Madraj Union has an average literacy rate of 40.4%.

Reference

See also
Unions of Bangladesh

Unions of Char Fasson Upazila 
Unions of Bhola District 
Char Fasson Upazila